The 2016 Jamaican Athletics Championships was the year's national outdoor track and field championships for Jamaica. It was held from 30 June – 3 July at the Independence Park in Kingston, Jamaica.

Results

Men

Women

References

Results
 2016 National Senior Champs Male Results. Jamaica Athletics Administrative Association. Retrieved 2021-04-02.
  2016 National Senior Champs Female Results. Jamaica Athletics Administrative Association. Retrieved 2021-04-02.

External links
 Jamaica Athletics Administrative Association website

Jamaican Athletics Championships
Jamaican Athletics Championships
Jamaican Athletics Championships
Jamaican Athletics Championships
Jamaican Athletics Championships
Sport in Kingston, Jamaica